The Voice South Africa is a South African television music competition to find new singing talent. The first season began airing on 31 January 2016 on M-Net. The season is hosted by Lungile Radu with Stacy Norman as the V-Reporter, and are joined by coaches Kahn Morbee, Lira, Bobby van Jaarsveld, and Karen Zoid.

Richard Stirton won the first season on 22 May 2016.

Teams
Colour key:
  Winner
  Runner-up
  Second Runner-up 
  Eliminated in the Live shows
  Artist was stolen by another coach at the Battles
  Eliminated in the Battles
  Artist withdrew from the competition

Blind auditions
Each coach has the length of the artists' performance to decide if they wanted that artist on their team. Should two or more coaches want the same artist, then the artist will choose their coach.

Colour key

Blind audition 1 (31 January)
The series premiere was broadcast on 31 January 2016.

Group performance: The Voice South Africa coaches – The Spirit of the Great Heart - Johnny Clegg"

South Africa
2016 South African television seasons